The Finnish-Socialist Workers' Party (Finnish: , SSTP) was a Finnish Nazi party that operated from 1934 to 1944 and was led by engineer Ensio Uoti.

The party program

In its program, the party stated that its core goal was to rebuild Finland as a "truly free nation state in the Finnish spirit". The central idea of Finnish socialism was that the state should take a strong role in banking and lending, but otherwise it should not interfere more in the economy. 

The party took a strict racial policy position, demanding the removal of all non-Finns from responsible positions. According to the party, civil rights should be reserved only for Finns. The SSTP in particular opposed Jews, but also Finland Swedes. Hostility towards Swedish-speakers distinguished SSTP from the bilingual Finnish People's Organisation. 

In addition, the SSTP demanded, among other things, censorship of publications that violate the values of the Finnish people and the centralization of administration to the head of state. The program was inspired by the program of the National Socialist German Workers' Party. Uoti had connections with the Germans and made trips to Germany to meet the Nazi leadership. To the Germans, he presented himself as the most loyal Finnish National Socialist. The SSTP logo had a blue swastika and the text SS.TP.

Elections
The SSTP participated in the 1936 parliamentary elections in the Uusimaa constituency with the slogan "better pay for work". Cars equipped with party election advertisements toured Helsinki, attracting attention thanks to the large swastika banners.

Banning
The SSTP was abolished after the Continuation War under Article 21 of the Moscow Armistice banning all fascist parties (which entered into force on 23 September 1944) on 12 October 1944.

Sources

References

External links
The party program (in Finnish)

Defunct political parties in Finland
Nationalist parties in Finland
Nazi parties
Political parties established in 1934
Nazism in Finland
Banned far-right parties
Anti-communist organisations in Finland